Liane Schmuhl (born 29 June 1961) is a German female former track and field athlete who competed in the shot put for East Germany.

This mark was later bettered by another East German, Bettina Libera, in 1985.

Her career high came in the 1982 season. Competing for the  club, she won a national title at the East German Indoor Athletics Championships, before throwing a new best of  indoors. She ranked second in the world that indoor season, after Bulgaria's Verzhinia Veselinova. This ranked her fourth globally that year, and continues to mark her as the third best ever under-23 European thrower (behind Natalya Lisovskaya and Ilona Slupianek). This moved her up to the 12th best thrower ever at that point in time, and as of 2018 she remains in the top 25 best shot putters.

A runner-up placing to Slupianek at the East German Athletics Championships gained Schmuhl selection for the 1982 European Athletics Championships, where she placed seventh in the final. She competed for one more season, with a throw of  being beyond her best but still in the global top twelve.

Her name was later published by Brigitte Berendonk among leaked Stasi documents showing that she was subject to the East German national doping programme.

International competitions

National titles
East German Indoor Athletics Championships
Shot put: 1982

References

External links

Living people
1961 births
East German female shot putters
German female shot putters
Doping cases in athletics
East German sportspeople in doping cases